Matt Dickinson is a film-maker and writer who is best known for his award-winning novels and his documentary work for National Geographic Television, Discovery Channel and the BBC. Dickinson was one of the climbers caught in the 1996 Mount Everest disaster. In 2003 he was the co-writer and director of Cloud Cuckoo Land—an independent British movie.

Biography 
He was a student at The Hemel Hempstead School up to the age of 16 and Gresham's School in Norfolk where he did his A levels. He joined the BBC in 1984, training as a researcher and production manager and working on programmes such as Wogan and Ever Decreasing Circles. Dickinson left in 1988 to pursue a freelance career as a production-director. In November 2015 Matt Dickinson visited schools across the UK to show students his achievements in his life, including to be part of the first camera crew to summit Mount Everest.

Specialising in adventure documentaries, Matt Dickinson's credits include BBC 1's Classic Adventure and several hour-long films such as Channel 4's Encounters, Equinox and ITV's Network First.

His programmes have been broadcast in more than thirty-five countries and have won awards at film festivals such as the Graz Mountain Film Festival, The Trento Mountain Film Festival and the Napa/Sonoma Film Festival.

In the pre-monsoon Everest season of 1996, amid the worst weather conditions on record, with Alan Hinkes, Britain's foremost high-altitude climber, Dickinson made a successful ascent of Mount Everest's notorious North Face, one of the most technically demanding climbs on the world's highest peak, beating hurricane-force winds and temperatures of minus 70 degrees Celsius. Three of the eight deaths on Everest that day were on the North Face. He was climbing further up Everest when he came across the famous 'Green Boots' he was confused why someone would have fallen asleep on the north face of Everest but it was soon to occur to him that this body was no longer alive. It was an Indian climber that was separated from the rest of his team in 1996 and was found for the first time.

He became one of the first British film-makers to film on the summit and return alive, and his film called Summit Fever has now been seen by more than twenty million people worldwide. His written account of the same expedition, The Death Zone (Random House) has been published to critical acclaim in more than fifteen countries.

Matt Dickinson's new series Mortal Chaos was commissioned by Oxford University Press in November 2010 and the first book in the series was published in January 2012.

Publications by Matt Dickinson
Dickinson's books include:
Long Distance Walks in North Africa (1992)
The Death Zone : Climbing Everest through the Killer Storm (1997)
The Other Side of Everest : Climbing the North Face Through the Killer Storm (2000)
Everest : Triumph and Tragedy on the World's Highest Peak (2002)
Black Ice (2003)
The Adrenaline Series: High, Epic, and Rough Water (2007)
High Risk (2009)
Mortal Chaos (2004)
Randomer (2013)
Matt Dickinson Rules! (2014)
The Everest Files,  (2015)

By Vertebrate Publishing:
 "Lie Kill Walk Away (2016)
 "The Everest Files" (2014)
 "The North Face" (2016)
 "The Killer Storm" (2017)
 "Popcorn-Eating Squirrels of the World Unite!: Four go nuts for popcorn" (2018)
 "Popcorn-Eating Squirrels Go Nuts on Everest" (2019)
 "Popcorn-Eating Squirrels Go Nuts with the Dinosaurs: 3" (2020)

References

External links
 Mount Everest Matt Dickinson Interview

.

British television directors
British documentary film directors
English film directors
People educated at Gresham's School
English mountain climbers
Year of birth missing (living people)
Living people
British summiters of Mount Everest
People from Harpenden